Kadongo Kamu is a music genre native to Uganda and is the oldest mainstream music genre in the country. The word "kadongo kamu" is a term in the Ganda language that means "one little guitar". To understand why the genre has this name, one has to understand the stylistic structure of the music which is created with only one acoustic guitar, a dry acoustic non-electric six-string guitar. But this is not always the case and many times other instruments are involved. However the true style of the music relies only on one acoustic guitar as instrumentation, hence the "one little guitar" name.

Form 
To understand why the acoustic guitar is the instrument of choice, again one has to understand the Ganda traditional music from which the music evolved. There is a drumming style and dance called "Bakisimba" in Ganda traditional music and it is one of the most well known drumming and dancing styles in traditional music in Uganda. The drum used in this music is a heavy bass drum that creates a pattern and sound that can easily be recreated with a bass guitar. The first musicians to practice this genre were inspired by this drumming pattern and started using guitars as an easier way of recreating the traditional sound without having to have a drum. This enabled them to move between various towns and villages while playing the music and delivering witty and reflective messages to various audiences that would all be familiar with the sound they were hearing. Thus the genre was born.

Most times the player of the guitar is usually the same person singing. Hence many practitioners tend to be good guitarists. The song structure is not well defined and can, in fact, seem like a long ode of some sort. The choruses are long and complex and are not meant to be repetitive and melodic like other genres. It is not music meant for dancing but rather for listening. That's why most singers are usually very witty and can deliver funny and thought provoking lyrics all in the same song. Just like the traditional music from which it came, storytelling is common place. Themes are usually centered on poverty, suffering, death and the general problems of life. It's because of this that the music is popular among peasants where poverty levels are much higher and there is a lot of empathy with the lyrical themes. This genre, because of its themes, also attracted political problems to the producers and artists. It is not uncommon for songs to last 10 minutes.

History 
Perhaps the first well-known artist of the genre was Fred Masagazi in the 60's. Masagazi is considered by many to be the father of kadongo kamu. His brand of educative singing won him many fans and he was one of the few musicians who was involved with Uganda's independence in 1962. Elly Wamala was another of the founders. Elly Wamala is credited with the invention of this genre but abandoned it because it was constantly and easily played informally by people he considered uneducated. It is common to find kadongo kamu artists staged on the streets of Kampala (Uganda's Capital City) entertaining a micro concert for a small fee usually raised by the crowd. The grandfather of this genre though is widely regarded to be Christopher Ssebaduka who last performed in 1996. Fred Masagazi and Eclas Kawalya are credited for having popularized it by actively recording in this genre in the 1960s and early 1970s. They were followed by a number of musicians who stayed true to the style and sound of the music. In the mid to late 1970s, during the dark days of Idi Amin, this genre was kept alive by Peterson Mutebi. Although many song themes revolve around suffering and outrage, the original artists of this genre sang about love and often praised women in recordings that hardly exceeded three and a half minutes. Herman Basudde was a very popular kadongo kamu musician in the 80's and 90's. Dan Mugula is one of the few surviving pioneers of the genre. Fred Sebatta and Paulo Kafeero made their mark in the 90's. Paulo Job Kafeero is also revered as one of the most skillful kadongo kamu musicians ever and his song Walumbe Zaaya is one of the best and most popular Ugandan songs ever.

Over the past decade, there have been other musicians, but they have been overshadowed by the pop musicians in the new bustling pop music scene. Today, the genre is still marginalized, but the music is loved by cultural loyalists in the Buganda region, as can be seen with current musicians like Fred Sebaale and Mathias Walukagga, who are still enjoying music success.

See also 
Baganda Music
Music of Uganda

References 

 

Ugandan music